Chakar Khan Rind, Mir Shakar Khan Rind, Meer Chaakar Khan Rind or Chakar The Great, Chakar-i-Azam Baloch Nation (1468–1565) (Balochi: میر چاکَر حان رِند) was a Baloch chieftain in the 14-15th century. He also aided Mughal Emperor Humayun in his reconquest of the Subcontinent. He is considered a folk hero of the Baloch people and an important figure in the Baloch epic Hani and Sheh Mureed.

Family
According to Baloch history, Mir Chakar Rind is descendant of Rind Khan, the son of the founder of Baloch Jalal Khan. Hometown of Mir Chakar Rind is Mand, Balochistan. His descendents moved to different parts of the region and Middle East. They carry his family
name Rind.

History

He became the head of Rind tribe at the age of 18 after the death of his father Mir Shehaq Rind. Mirjat Chakar's fiefdom was short-lived because of the great civil war between the Lashari and Rind tribes of Balochistan. Mir Chakar as head of his tribe went to war, which resulted in thousands of dead. The war and the gallantry of the two tribe leaders continues to be a part of the Baloch peoples' history. After the "Thirty Years' War" against the Lashari Tribe.
Mir Chakar was a very brave man who desired to make the Baloch nation powerful. 
When Mir Chakar left Dhadar, his next stop was Sanghar Desert, in Taunsa, Dera Ghazi Khan. He ruled the Sanghar area for many years. No one could defeat Mir Chakar and his army until Mir Doda Khan arrived with his army. Although Mir Chakar had defeated Mir Doda once before, Mir Doda was badly frozen.
Mir Doda Khan defeated Mir Chakar in the desert of Sanghar, after which Mir Chakar and his army left Sanghar and moved to the Multan area where he shook hands with the Multan king. On the other side, Shehmureed had gone to Arabia. After Shehmureed, one of his best fighters was Mir Malagh Khan Rind.

No one but Mir Malagh could handle it. 
Mir Qaiser Khan, Mir Sanjar Khan and Mir Mandar Khan were some of Mir Chakar's best fighters. 
Mir Chakar and the Multan king then planned to conquer Delhi. The Multan king asked for Mir Chakar's help, and he gave him his best fighters. The Lashkar (campaign) was led by Mir Malagh Khan and Mir Qaiser Khan, who went and they conquered Delhi. 
After this, the Delhi king purportedly said, "There was not a single nail uncovered of the Baloch. Their head could reach the glaring sun. They were united; they were brave!" 
On the other side, Mir Doda was gaining power. His grandsons Mir Ghazi Khan and Mir Ismail Khan were his best fighters. The Dera Ghazi Khan and Dera Ismail Khan districts of Pakistan are named after these two. 
The Multan king invited Mir Doda to dinner. When Mir Doda came, the Multan king said that from then on he would be his left hand. 
Mir Chakar became angry and planned to attack Mir Doda. In the battle, Mir Doda was badly defeated and his people and army moved to Sindh and never came back.

Near the desert of Sanghar he built 100 houses for his relatives to live in, and he named the place Sokar which is now part of Taunsa. This place is still located near the Sanghar desert in Tehsil Taunsa, Dera Ghazi Khan District.
Mir Malagh Khan also lived there as he was the best fighter of Mir Chakar. Malghani Balochs are the descendants of this great man. Now Sokar is the hometown of Malghani Baloch Tribe.

Mir Chakar then settled in Satghara, Okara and gained power and respect in the area. Sher Shah Suri sent a message to Mir Chakar to unite with him and consolidate his gains. Mir Chakar appreciated the offer but refused to help Sher Shah Suri. Under the command of his son, Mir Shahdad Khan, his forces instead joined the Mughal army of Emperor Humayun in 1555 after a long exile in Persia. Emperor Humayun came back, recaptured Delhi, and ousted the Suri dynasty in 1556. As a reward, Emperor Humayun conferred a vast Jagir (lands), including horses and slaves, to Mir Chakar. He ruled this territory until he died in 1565. People who accompanied Mir Chakar to Satghara after leaving Balochistan constructed a tomb for his body. Noori Naseer Khan of Kalat and Meer Chakar are both Baloch heroes.

Historical Documents 

According to Tarikh - i -Farishtah ' , Mir Chákar Rind was a holder of big jāgir and commanded hordes of warriors in the Punjab. Tarikh-i-Sher Shahi in E.D., iv 389-397 gives - Chakur Rind correctly.  Mansel Longworth Dames The fact that Chakar Rind was powerful is also described by Munshi (Khulasat-ut-Tawarikh), Nihavandi and Tabakat-i Akbari.

Eponymous institutions
Following two institutions, one in Balochistan and other in Punjab, are named after him:

Mir Chakar Khan Rind University, Luni, Sibi
Mir Chakar Khan Rind University of Technology, Dera Ghazi Khan

References

External links
PHI Persian Literature in translation
Mir Chakar Rind

Baloch people
Nawabs of Balochistan, Pakistan
People from Sahiwal District
People from Sibi District
Mughal Empire
1468 births
1565 deaths
15th-century Iranian people
16th-century Iranian people